Route 385, or Highway 385, may refer to:

Canada
 New Brunswick Route 385
 Quebec Route 385

Japan
 Japan National Route 385

United States
  Interstate 385
  U.S. Route 385
  Arkansas Highway 385
  Florida State Road 385
  Georgia State Route 385
  Maryland Route 385 (former)
  New York State Route 385
 New York State Route 385 (former)
  Ohio State Route 385
  South Carolina Highway 385
  Tennessee State Route 385
 Texas:
  Texas State Highway Loop 385
  Ranch to Market Road 385
  Virginia State Route 385
Territories
  Puerto Rico Highway 385